Fiji competed in the 1978 Commonwealth Games in Edmonton, Alberta, Canada from August 3 to August 12, 1978. All of their entrants competed in the lawn bowls competitions.

Lawn bowls

Seven lawn bowlers represented Fiji in 1978.

References

Nations at the 1978 Commonwealth Games
Fiji at the Commonwealth Games
1978 in Fijian sport